Friedrich Baum (1727–1777) was a German dragoon Lieutenant Colonel of Brunswick in British service during the American Revolutionary War.

Battle of Bennington 
For Baum, the campaign ended at the Battle of Bennington, on August 16, 1777. Arriving in Canada with the Brunswick army in the winter of 1776, Burgoyne detailed Baum with around 600 Brunswickers, British, and Indians from Fort Edward to try to collect provisions, horses, and Loyalist reinforcements for Burgoyne's main force for the march south toward Albany. However, nearly 2,000 rebels, consisting of New Hampshire forces under John Stark and the remnants of Seth Warner's Green Mountain Boys following the costly Battle of Hubbardton, were arrayed against Baum's men. Also among Stark's forces were Massachusetts men under Reverend Thomas Allen, leading a contingent of Pittsfield militia.  Allen, who had been outraged at the abandonment of Fort Ticonderoga to Burgoyne at the beginning of July, complained to Stark that if his men did not get to fight at Bennington they would never answer another call to arms.

Although Baum had served in several engagements in Europe during the Seven Years' War, he had little battlefield command experience. In contrast, his adversary Stark had served with Robert Rogers' Rangers, including the Battle of Ticonderoga; and he had distinguished himself as an American leader at Bunker Hill, Trenton, and Princeton.

Baum's lack of experience showed at Bennington, where he encamped his forces in such a way that they were separated and unable to communicate easily with each other. Communications were also hampered in some degree by the inability of Baum, who spoke only German, to speak English.

Baum had been assigned a loyalist from the nearby region to guide his forces and attest to the character of any indigenous people encountered along the way. According to a field report that was later published in the London Gazette by Burgoyne himself:

Putting his superior numbers to best use, Stark surrounded each of Baum's forces and attacked simultaneously, overwhelming each redoubt. In the melée, Baum was captured after sustaining a mortal stomach wound, from which his surgeon, Julius Friedrich Wasmus, also captured, was unable to save him.

Seeing he was badly outnumbered, Baum had requested reinforcements from Burgoyne, who sent Lieutenant Colonel Heinrich von Breymann and a corps of light infantrymen and Brunswick grenadiers to support him. However, Breymann, who disliked Baum, marched slowly to the site, making less than one mile per hour, arriving after Baum had already been overrun and captured.

Legacy
Colonel Baum Road, which runs through the Washington County, New York town of Easton, just south of the Village of Greenwich, is named for Baum.

Notes

References 
 Richard M. Ketchum, Saratoga, 1997.
 Wasmus, J.F, An Eyewitness Account Of The American Revolution And New England Life. The Journal Of J.F. Wasmus, German Company Surgeon, 1776-1783

External links 
 

1727 births
1777 deaths
18th-century German people
Brunswick military personnel of the American Revolutionary War
British military personnel killed in the American Revolutionary War